The Jiu is a river in southern Romania. It is formed near Petroșani by the confluence of headwaters Jiul de Vest and Jiul de Est.

It flows southward through the Romanian counties Hunedoara, Gorj and Dolj before flowing into the Danube near Zăval, a few kilometers upstream from the Bulgarian city of Oryahovo.

The upper Jiu Valley, around Petroșani and Lupeni, is Romania's principal coal mining region.

Towns and cities
The following towns are situated along the river Jiu, from source to mouth: Petroșani (Jiul de Est), Lupeni (Jiul de Vest), Bumbești-Jiu, Târgu Jiu, Turceni, Filiași, Craiova.

Tributaries

The following rivers are tributaries to the river Jiu (from source to mouth):

Left: Jiul de Est, Izvor, Polatiștea, Radul, Pârâul Alb, Păiușu, Chițiu, Sadu, Curpenoasa, Tetila, Iazu Topilelor, Hodinău, Amaradia (Gorj), Dâmbova, Cioiana, Gilort, Fratoștița, Cârnești, Răcari, Brădești, Amaradia (Dolj), Preajba, Lumaș, Leu, Gioroc
Right: Jiul de Vest, Cândețu, Murga Mică, Murga Mare, Dumitra, Cerbănașu, Bratcu, Porcu, Sâmbotin, Cartiu, Pietroasa, Șușița (Gorj), Tismana, Timișeni, Jilț, Ceplea, Șușița (Mehedinți), Motru, Bâlta, Racovița, Argetoaia, Raznic, Tejac, Ulm, Prodila

See also
Jiu Valley

References

Rivers of Romania
 
Rivers of Hunedoara County
Rivers of Gorj County
Rivers of Dolj County